Claires Court School is a 2–18 all-through private day school and sixth form in Maidenhead, Berkshire, England. As one of a small number of diamond schools located in the United Kingdom, it is unique in that while its nursery and sixth form are mixed, the primary and secondary phases are single-sex.

History 

Founded in 1960 by David and Josephine Wilding, as a day and boarding school for boys aged 6+ to 13, Claires Court grew quickly to 180 pupils by 1970. Ridgeway, originally acquired in 1964 to provide full and weekly boarding accommodation, was converted to be the junior school in 1975 when the age range at the Ray Mill Road East site was extended to 16 year-olds. By 1980 the school roll was approximately 280.

Having joined the teaching staff in September 1975, their son James became Master in charge of the Senior School in January 1981; the previous August the family business had been joined by Hugh as Bursar.  In 1993, the Wildings acquired Maidenhead College, an independent day school for girls, formerly known as the Convent of the Nativity. In January 2017, the school continues on three sites; a co-ed Nursery leads to separate single sex boys and girls sections providing education to 16+, the co-ed Sixth form, now in its 25th year, completes the diamond.

Sport

In December 2017, Claires Court under 13 girls won the ISA London West Netball Tournament.

Facilities

On 28 November 2013 and 23 June 2016 the local Maidenhead Advertiser covered plans to coalesce the existing three sites onto that of the Junior Boys school.  The converged site had a planned capacity of just under 1200 students. On 4 January 2018 the Maidenhead Advertiser reported that the school had applied for planning permission for the new campus. On 28 August 2019, at a meeting of the Planning Committee, RBWM councillors officially and near unanimously rejected the applications after detailed objections from local residents, who had campaigned for over three years to prevent the loss of greenbelt and against the detrimental environmental and infrastructure effects cited by the council members as the reasons for refusal. The school appealed the decision, but on 21 December 2020 the appeal for the school campus and Hockey club infrastructure was rejected.

Notable former pupils

Notable alumni include:
Farah Zeynep Abdullah, Ali Bastian, Christian Colson, Chris Cracknell, Simon Dennis, Michael Geoghegan, Amber Hill, Nick Kennedy, Nils Mordt, James (Lord) O'Shaughnessy, Ellie Rayer, Mark Richardson, and Ben Sneesby.

Current status
As at the 2017 Annual School Census, 130 teachers and 50 assistants have charge of 1090 pupils, supported by a further 150 ancillary staff. The school has a successful athletics program, and several students have become national champions.

Sport
The School has a very successful rowing club called the Claires Court School Boat Club.

References

External links
 

Private schools in the Royal Borough of Windsor and Maidenhead
Boys' schools in Berkshire
Girls' schools in Berkshire
Member schools of the Independent Schools Association (UK)
Educational institutions established in 1960
1960 establishments in England
Maidenhead
Diamond schools